State Road 580 (SR 580) is a major commercial and commuter route serving northern Pinellas and central Hillsborough County, Florida,   The western terminus is an intersection with Broadway Street (U.S. Route 19 Alternate (US 19 Alt.)-SR 595 in Dunedin); the current eastern terminus is an intersection with 56th Street (SR 583) next to the campuses of Florida College and Florida Christian College in northeastern Tampa.  The historical eastern terminus is an intersection with US 301-SR 43 near Temple Terrace, two miles (3 km) to the east.

Route description

The heavily traveled SR 580 is locally known by a variety of names. In Pinellas County (Dunedin, Safety Harbor, and Oldsmar) it is Skinner Boulevard, Main Street and Tampa Road. A motorist continuing eastward on SR 580 in Hillsborough County drives on Tampa Road, Hillsborough Avenue (through Town 'n' Country), Dale Mabry Highway (between US 92-SR 600 and SR 597), and Busch Boulevard (which continues past the eastern SR 580 terminus as Bullard Parkway).

Noteworthy sites along or near SR 580 include Countryside Mall, Trinity College, Tampa International Airport, Hillsborough Community College, Raymond James Stadium, Busch Gardens Tampa Bay, and the two colleges on the State Road's eastern terminus.  SR 580 crosses Safety Harbor - the northwestern tip of Old Tampa Bay − at the SR 580 Bridge between Oldsmar and Safety Harbor.

Major intersections

State Road 580A

State Road 580A (SR 580A) is both West Saint Petersburg and East Saint Petersburg Drive, a former segment of SR 580 in Oldsmar, Florida. The road begins at the intersection of SR 580 and County Road 233. Most of the road runs halfway between SR 580 and the north shore of Safety Harbor. The east end is at SR 580 between SR 584 and Race Track Road.

The road was established during a realignment of SR 580 in Oldsmar during the mid-to-late-1990's.

References

External links

580
580
580
580